Sundarapandiapuram is a panchayat town in Tenkasi district, in the Indian state of Tamil Nadu. It is known for its ancient temples and scenic beauty. It is a popular setting for many Tamil films and regional sitcoms.

Demographics
In the India census, Sundarapandiapuram had a population of 7,705. Males constituted 50% of the population and females, 50%. It had an average literacy rate of 65%, higher than the national average of 59.5%. The male literacy rate in the town was 74%, while the female literacy rate was lower at 56%. 11% of the population was under 6 years of age.

By the 2011 census, the town had grown to 8,957 inhabitants.

Economy 
The main economy of this village is farming and cattle farming. The main crops are rice paddy, sunflower seeds, green chilly, onion, and coconut farming. Cattle farming involves food requirements like milk and another for labour purposes like ploughing, irrigation, etc.

In popular culture 
The critically and commercially successful Tamil movie Roja was also shot here.

References 

Cities and towns in Tenkasi district